Grand Forks Mercantile Company is a property in Grand Forks, North Dakota that was listed on the National Register of Historic Places in 1982. Built in 1893, the building includes Early Commercial and Italianate architecture.

The Flatiron Building, built in 1906, and the Iddings Block, built in 1892, are two other wholesale buildings in Grand Forks that were listed on the National Register, within the N. Third Street wholesale district.

It housed a wholesale grocery business.

See also
Grand Forks Mercantile Building 1898

References

Commercial buildings on the National Register of Historic Places in North Dakota
Buildings designated early commercial in the National Register of Historic Places in North Dakota
Italianate architecture in North Dakota
Commercial buildings completed in 1893
National Register of Historic Places in Grand Forks, North Dakota
1893 establishments in North Dakota
Grocery store buildings